Tushara is a major Kannada monthly literary magazine, published in Karnataka, India, which has its headquarters in Manipal, Karnataka.

The magazine includes columns such as ′Sarasa′ (meaning: Naughty), ′Mathininda Lekhanige′ (meaning: From speech to pen), ′Sahitya Avalokana′ (meaning: Literature overview), ′Kannada Kathaloka′ (meaning: Kannada story world), ′Makkala Kathe′ (meaning: Children's stories), ′Vishwa Kathe′ (meaning: World story) and ′Masadamathu′ (meaning: indestructible words).

Sandhya Pai is the Managing editor, of the magazine.

History 
The magazine, launched in April 1973, is the second publication of Manipal Media Network Ltd. (MMNL).

Sister publications 
 Roopatara, a Kannada monthly film magazine
 Taranga, a Kannada weekly family interest magazine
 Tunturu, a Kannada bi-monthly children magazine
 Udayavani, a Kannada daily newspaper

See also 
 Mayura, a Kannada monthly literary magazine
 List of Kannada-language magazines
 Media in Karnataka
 Media in India

References 

1973 establishments in Karnataka
Monthly magazines published in India
Kannada-language magazines
Magazines established in 1973
Mass media in Bangalore
Literary magazines published in India